The 1994 Las Vegas Sting season was the first season for the Las Vegas Sting. They finished the 1994 season 5–7 and lost in the quarterfinals of the AFL playoffs to the Albany Firebirds.

Regular season

Schedule

Standings

Playoffs
The Sting were seeded seventh overall in the AFL playoffs.

Awards

References

Anaheim Piranhas seasons
1994 Arena Football League season
Las Vegas Sting Season, 1994
20th century in Las Vegas